Zaccaro is a surname. Notable people with the surname include:

John Zaccaro (born 1933), American real estate developer
Maurizio Zaccaro (born 1952), Italian film director, cinematographer, film editor, and screenwriter
Stephen Zaccaro (born 1955), American psychology professor

See also
Vaccaro